Martin Vozábal (born 8 November 1978 in Tábor) is a Czech former professional footballer who played in the Gambrinus Liga for Dynamo České Budějovice. He was a participant at the 2000 Olympic Games.

References

External links
 
 
 Dynamo České Budějovice profile 
 

Living people
1978 births
People from Tábor
Association football midfielders
Czech footballers
Czech Republic youth international footballers
Czech Republic under-21 international footballers
Footballers at the 2000 Summer Olympics
Olympic footballers of the Czech Republic
Czech First League players
SK Slavia Prague players
FC Hradec Králové players
Xanthi F.C. players
FK Viktoria Žižkov players
SK Dynamo České Budějovice players
1. FC Slovácko players
FK Baník Most players
FC Fastav Zlín players
Expatriate footballers in Greece
Czech expatriate sportspeople in Greece
Sportspeople from the South Bohemian Region